Stormbreaker is a 2000 novel by Anthony Horowitz.

Stormbreaker may also refer to: 

 Stormbreaker (film), a film based on the novel by Anthony Horowitz
 Stormbreaker: The Graphic Novel, a comic book tie-in for the film written by Antony Johnston and illustrated by Kanako Dameru and Yuzuru Takasaki
 Alex Rider: Stormbreaker, a video game based on the above film
 Stormbreaker (comics), the hammer wielded by the Marvel Comics superhero Beta Ray Bill
 Stormbreaker (Marvel Cinematic Universe), the Marvel Cinematic Universe (MCU) counterpart wielded by Thor
 Stormbreaker: The Saga of Beta Ray Bill, a 2005 six-issue miniseries from Marvel Comics
 Stormbreaker (album)
 GBU-53/B StormBreaker, an American 250-pound air-launch, precision-guided glide bomb